, better known simply as Hiromi, is a Japanese fashion model who has been active in the professional and commercial modeling fields since late 2000s. Formerly a popular model for the Egg magazine, she is known for her androgynous looks and is particularly known in the gal scene.

Biography

Modeling
She modeled for the Egg magazine during the years 2005 through 2007 and began appearing on the Happie Nuts magazine in late 2007.

Her notable works include appearing on the Happie Nuts magazine and endorsing 109-2, the men's line of the 109 brand. She has signed advertising contracts with several products and brands such as Jungle Beat, M.A.C's Japanese branch, and the third issue of the Buchiage Trance series of trance compilation albums.

Music
Aside from modeling, she has worked as an exclusive disc jockey for girls-duo Lil'B. She has released several psy trance CDs since 2007, under the alias of "DJ Reika", such as Psy-Trance Queen and Psy-Trance Queen Vol.2: Hagane.

Personal life
Hiromi is an out lesbian. She publicly acknowledged her homosexuality, which she had kept hidden for a long time, in the April, 2011 issue of the Happie Nuts magazine. In 2011, she revealed that she was dating a female model named Aura.

References

External
Official blog powered by Ameba 
Official Twitter 
Profile by Shibuya Girls Collection 
Profile by Casting.net 

1990 births
Japanese DJs
Japanese female models
Filipino emigrants to Japan
Lesbian musicians
LGBT DJs
LGBT models
Japanese LGBT musicians
Filipino LGBT musicians
Living people